is a Japanese manga series written and illustrated by Nobuhiro Watsuki. It is a remake of his Rurouni Kenshin series, and served to promote the then upcoming live-action film released in August 2012. The manga was serialized in Shueisha's Jump Square from May 2012 to June 2013 and collected into two tankōbon volumes.

In North America, Viz Media licensed the manga for English-language release and serialized it on their digital magazine Weekly Shonen Jump. The two volumes were released in June 2013 and January 2014. Critical response to the manga has been positive, with praise focused on its fight scenes, though the narrative in general was the subject of mixed opinions, with critics either finding it too light or dark based on the fight scenes. Nevertheless, Watsuki's art was the subject of praise, including his character designs and fight sequences.

Plot
Himura Kenshin stumbles upon gambling fights hosted by the merchant Takeda Kanryū. One of the fighters is Kamiya Kaoru who participates in the fights to be able to pay the rent from her swordsmanship school. After learning that Kanryū plans to kill Kaoru, Myōjin Yahiko requests Kenshin's help to save her. Kenshin defeats Kanryū and stays in Kaoru's dojo with Yahiko for an unknown reason. Wishing revenge, Kanryū hires multiple fighters to defeat Kenshin. The first of them, Sagara Sanosuke, is defeated by Kenshin who convinces him to help taking care of Kaoru's dojo. Shortly afterwards one of Kenshin's old enemies from the Bakumatsu, the Shinsegumi Saitō Hajime, takes Sanosuke's job.

Saitō is revealed to be living now as a policeman working as an agent investigating Takeda's crimes and thus only interacts with Kenshin. However, Takeda keeps sending more assassins to get his revenge on Kenshin who is protected by Sanosuke and Yahiko. The maniac former Shinsengumi Udo Jin-e kidnaps Kaoru and attempts to kill her to corrupt Kenshin, sending him back to his hitokiri persona in combat. Before Kenshin is about to murder Jin-e in rage, Kaoru manages to stop him, having survived to the former Shinsengumi's attack. Jin-e commits suicide while Kenshin returns to the Kamiya Kasshin Ryu dojo where he starts living.

Production
Nobuhiro Watsuki said the idea of drawing Rurouni Kenshin again after more than 10 years was initiated because the live-action film adaptation was green-lit, but revealed that he had personally always desired to write the series again. The opportunity to write Rurouni Kenshin to please longtime fans and potential new readers is what caused him to "grab [his] pen again." Although Watsuki was working for Jump Square, there was debate about whether or not to publish this new work in Weekly Shōnen Jump, the highest-circulated magazine in Japan where the original manga ran. But because its current series and new authors are Weekly Shōnen Jumps priority, it was decided that a one-shot would be published in Weekly Jump and a short series would run in Jump Square.

When deciding what to actually write for the short series, Watsuki knew fans most likely wanted the Hokkaido arc that ended as a rough draft. But he revealed that the conclusion of the theme was the main reason the original manga ended, and with him unable to come up with a new one, he said that there was "just no way" he could write it. (Watsuki later began The Hokkaido Arc in 2016.) Watsuki's next idea was a sequel about the next generation; either a story about Yahiko or one combining Kenshin's child Kenji and Yahiko's child Shinya to make Ken - Shin. But he said that would mean it is not about the Kenshin, and felt that while it was acceptable as a "continuation" of the original manga, it was not suitable for Restoration. He next considered a prequel, but realized that would mean Kenshin's friends could not appear, making a prequel more suitable for the one-shot. Watsuki's last idea was for a "parallel story," which he defined as "another" or "separate" story that works as a "pleasant gimmick" allowing one to enjoy a work in a different form. But said one thing you can not do is change a character's foundation, as that would make it "fake." Many ideas were rejected when writing the script for the film, one of his rejected was a thirty-week story he envisioned "before Rurouni," making it a "story based on a template." Watsuki described it as "worthy of another Kenshin story" and in line with promoting the film. This became Rurouni Kenshin: Restoration.

The first thing Watsuki thought about when starting it was what he should change besides the structure. He described the process of writing a serial manga as like building a "multi-layered three-dimensional puzzle"; putting together differently shaped pieces to make it entertaining and worth reading every week or month. He called it an organic process where even the author can not envision its completed form until it is done. Although Restoration was a monthly serial, because it had already been "built" once before, the artist said it was more like a one-shot or "flat puzzle." He challenged himself to express Kenshin's inner feelings. Watsuki compared Kenshin's role in the original manga to that of Kōmon in Mito Kōmon or Yoshimune's in Abarenbō Shōgun, where the supporting characters built the drama and he was the hero who would defeat the villains. This made it easy to express the thoughts of the surrounding characters but not Kenshin's, so he wanted to "dig deeper" into Kenshin this time. It turned out harder than he imagined. Although drawing it was not difficult, when he tried to make it entertaining the story got gloomier due to Kenshin's regrets. By chapter four he got worried it would be a repeat of the Jinchū Arc of the original manga. This is when he gave up digging deeper into Kenshin's thoughts.

Character changes
Watsuki tried expressing more of Kenshin's inner feelings in Restoration; a man who brought about a peaceful new era can not find his place because of the acts he committed in the past. He tried expressing this with the "pool of blood" theme. The author said this version of the character seems slightly more immature than the original because he is more reserved and excitable; "perhaps he isn't too hero-like." Watsuki changed the way Hiten Mitsurugi-ryū and its techniques are written purely for fun. The editorial office even got a phone call pointing this out. The most noticeable change in his appearance is the addition of a white scarf, "scarf = hero." Watsuki also changed his cross-shaped scar; leaving it white for Kenshin, but shading it black when his Battōsai persona takes over. The author said because of the way he draws now, he struggled with Kenshin's hair, unable to get the original bushy feeling it had until the end.

Because Kenshin is more immature, Watsuki said Kaoru became slightly more mature with him mixing in some "older sister" qualities, although he did not realize it at the time. With the "aversion" to violent heroines being strong in recent years, he made sure to remove violent expressions when she calls people out. Her biggest physical change is the lack of a part in her bangs. To emphasize that she is a female swordsman, she wears a kimono and hakama.

Watsuki said that Yahiko had the most growth out of all the characters in Restoration. Although originally created to have a child's perspective since Rurouni Kenshin was a shōnen manga with a 30-something-year-old main character, in reality Weekly Shōnen Jumps main demographic was middle school and high school kids, slightly older than Yahiko. Additionally, Watsuki's readers were even older than that. The author suspects his intentions might have been misguided, so Yahiko evolves through the story this time. The biggest changes in his appearance are his hair and eyes; the former was made shorter so as not to be so similar to Sanosuke's, and the latter see his pupils drawn smaller with a more menacing look in the first half, to make his growth more apparent.

With Sanosuke, the author struggled most with how much of his Sekihō Army background to include, because, although unrelated to the story, it is a big part of his character. He ultimately only touched on it due to length restrictions, which he said was disappointing. The most notable change in his appearance is the addition of red knuckle gloves, to emphasize that he is a bare-knuckle fighter. Watsuki also added a "touch" of Kamen Rider 2.

Keeping Saitō's role as Kenshin's comrade connected by a strange friendship, Watsuki felt condensing the story strengthened their bond even more. His uniform is the most notable change in his appearance; when the character was originally created the author had very little reference material, so this time he made it more historically accurate thanks to the internet. Watsuki initially depicted Jin-e as attacking Kenshin out of sheer madness, but then gave him a motive. He called this a miscalculation because it diminished the character's level of madness compared to the original. This time he left out Jin-e's Shin no Ippō technique for being too supernatural, but that too diminished some excitement unique to shōnen manga; another miscalculation. The biggest change in his appearance is his skin tone, done to increase his oddity, but this made keeping the tone of the entire story consistent difficult. "A lot of things didn't work out in Restoration for Jin-e. It drove home that the original version of Jin-e is the perfect and the ultimate."

Because Kanryū is the last boss in both Restoration and the live-action film, Watsuki did not plan on making any big changes to him. But that changed after seeing Teruyuki Kagawa's "fanatical" portrayal of the character in the film. The most notable change in his appearance is the shape of his glasses; they are round to give a more Meiji era feel, but the author feels this was a mistake as square suited his apathetic ways more. Watsuki said that Banjin and Gein's roles were so drastically changed that he used versions of them from Kenshin Saihitsu.

Act Zero production
Watsuki had five goals for the prequel one-shot; make sure current readers of Weekly Shōnen Jump who had never read the original Rurouni Kenshin could enjoy it, make sure existing fans would enjoy it, fill in the gaps of an element he had missed, include an element he had never used before, and tie the ending into the first chapter of Restoration. To address the first goal he narrowed the pre-existing characters down to only Kenshin, used a familiar story structure to make it easy to read, and added comedy. To achieve the second he connected Kenshin's flashback scene in the middle to the ending spread where he included characters that were on the covers of the kanzenban edition of Rurouni Kenshin. For the third goal, Watsuki elaborated on the common question of "Why would Kenshin, who wandered for ten years, suddenly stop in the First Act?" In Act Zero Elder notices Kenshin's unhealed emotional scar and her kind advice has a slight effect on him, becoming the motivation for his actions in the first chapter. The author included an element he never used before by including a Westerner. Despite Rurouni Kenshin being set in an era of modernization and Westernization, it never featured a Western character. Additionally, the one-shot is set in Yokohama's foreign settlement, where Watsuki visited in the spring for research. In order to tie the ending into the first chapter of Restoration, he simply used the recurring narration seen often in the series, commenting "Oh, the number of times I've written that narration..." Watsuki said he struggled to decide on these five points until going to dinner with Hisashi Sasaki, his first editor on the original Rurouni Kenshin. After talking in the cab ride on the way to the restaurant, they came up with the framework in only 15 minutes. Watsuki said this reminded him that Rurouni Kenshin would not have been possible without Sasaki.

Watsuki said that while the character of Elder might seem gimmicky at first glance, she is the result of a long period of planning and struggle. When he was about to "lose it" over thinking of how he needed a heroine for Kenshin to save, a doctor to give him advice, a Western character, and a character to be pursued by bad guys, Watsuki's novelist wife Kaoru Kurosaki "boldly" suggested to combine them all into one. Kurosaki also suggested she be a pretty girl hiding behind a mask. Because the mask is gimmicky, Watsuki said her design had to be somewhat plain. He took the name Elder from a medicinal herb. He also said that she is a distant relative (unacquainted) of Hildegard Peaberry from his series Embalming -The Another Tale of Frankenstein-.

Asahiyama Dankichi was originally thought of as a soldier and lover or elder brother of a heroine, but once Elder was decided on, he was no longer a main character. He was reborn as someone familiar with the foreign settlement, one of Elder's few allies and guide. Watsuki said because of his macho rickshawman personality, he seemed to almost overshadow the main character and had to have his role reduced, which was a "pity." His last name is taken from a mountain in Watsuki's hometown, while the author said his first name "had to be" Dankichi because he pulls a car. Watsuki said his design was impromptu and that he regrets that his face and hairstyle are slightly different from frame to frame.

Espiral came about from the idea of having Kenshin face a Western sword-style. He was initially going to be more of a rival than a villain; living in the West where the sword is obsolete, he traveled to Japan to fight a samurai, and changes his ways after being saved by Elder, becoming her bodyguard back in the West. But he would have taken up eight pages in the epilogue, about 1/6th of the entire page count, and so became the villain you see in the finished story. Although Watsuki feels having a simple villain was best for the one shot, he said this was a "pity." His name is Spanish for "spiral" and all his techniques are related to that word. His design is basically the opposite of Kenshin; short black hair, white top, black pants, and a long glove on his right arm to emphasize his dominant hand.

Both Watsuki and the editorial staff were surprised by how well-received Act Zero was by readers and how high it ranked in the reader surveys.

Publication
In December 2011, Shueisha announced that Watsuki would be putting his then current serialized manga Embalming -The Another Tale of Frankenstein- on hold to begin a "reboot" of Rurouni Kenshin, called Rurouni Kenshin: Cinema Version, as a tie-in to the then upcoming live-action film. The series began in the June 2012 issue of Jump Square, which was released on May 2, 2012, and ended in the July 2013 issue on June 4, 2013. It was created to honor the anniversary of the anime series and the release of the live-action film. Inspired by the film, Watsuki wanted to reintroduce Kenshin's character in a new manga. He thought about redesigning the cast but decided to stay true to the originals' looks. Instead he made subtle changes including Kenshin's scarf and Saitō wearing a more realistic outfit.

The reboot depicts the battles that are featured in the first live-action film, with differences. A special chapter, titled , was published in Weekly Shōnen Jump on August 20, 2012 as a prologue to Cinema Version and included in Restorations first volume. Shueisha collected the chapters in two tankōbon volumes, released on September 4, 2012 and July 4, 2013.

A light novel adaptation of Restoration, titled , written by Watsuki's wife Kaoru Kurosaki, was released on September 4, 2012. Watsuki said it utilizes one of the rejected ideas she had for the live-action film. It is a version of Restorations New Kurogasa (Jin-E) Arc, featuring Inui Banjin and a different younger Gein, both members of Yukishiro Enishi's team in the Jinchū Arc of the original Rurouni Kenshin manga.

On May 7, 2012, it was announced in Viz Media's digital manga magazine Weekly Shonen Jump Alpha that Rurouni Kenshin: Cinema Version would join its line-up, under the title Rurouni Kenshin: Restoration. It ran from May 21, 2012 to June 10, 2013, while Act Zero was published on September 4, 2012. Viz Media released the first volume on June 4, 2013, and the second was published on January 14, 2014.

Volume list

Reception
In a review about the series' reboot, Publishers Weekly praised the manga for appealing to both newcomers as well as old fans of Rurouni Kenshin. The reviewer also noted the manga had light parts during its comedy which he found strange in the samurai genre. Kat Kan of Voice of Youth Advocates shared similar feelings, but suggested it to try it for older teens rather than children as a result of its violent content. Rebecca Silverman from Anime News Network praised the reboot for the focus on Kenshin and Yahiko's development but criticized Kaoru and Saito for lacking focus. Chris Beveridge appreciated the fight scenes, most notably due to how they are presented in this retelling as Sanosuke is stronger than in the original manga, making his duel with Kenshin more enjoyable. Although ICv2 enjoyed the reboot, the writer had mixed thoughts about the speech patterns given towards Kenshin but still praised his heroic persona. Leroy Douresseaux was more negative, finding the Takeda's arc boring and the plot in general too lighthearted for the shonen genre. Manga News enjoyed how Watsuki managed to retell a storyline from the original series in only two volumes. Matthew Warner from the Fandom Post stated that the reboot managed to distance itself from the first manga based on how different are the fights and praised Yahiko's character arc in his battle.

The artwork was praised by ICv2 for how Watsuki handles fight scenes among side other details. Douresseaux liked Watsuki's character designs, most notably Kenshin's describing it as "colorful" among other "misfits". Silverman praised how Watsuki's art in general has improved ever since his previous Buso Renkin making the characters more attractive than the original manga alongside other backgrounds as well perform better fight scenes. Manga News found the character designs appealing, citing mostly the Western based, due to how distinctive they are despite franchise' older origins.

In Japan, the manga was well received, with the second volume reaching 82,898 sales. Similarly, the manga appeared in The New York Times sales from North America.

References

External links
 Official website at Jump Square 
 

Rurouni Kenshin
Adventure anime and manga
Historical anime and manga
Martial arts anime and manga
Reboot comics
Samurai in anime and manga
Shōnen manga
Shueisha manga
Viz Media manga